This is a list of places on the Victorian Heritage Register in the City of Banyule in Victoria, Australia. The Victorian Heritage Register is maintained by the Heritage Council of Victoria.

The Victorian Heritage Register, as of 2020, lists the following 21 state-registered places within the City of Banyule:

References 

Banyule
City of Banyule